Carlos Ramos may refer to:

 Carlos Ramos (footballer, born 1958), Chilean footballer
 Carlos Ramos Rivas (born 1959), politician from Venezuela
 Carlos Ramos (umpire) (born 1971), Portuguese tennis umpire
 Carlos Josafat Ramos (born 1986), footballer from Mexico
 Carlos Ramos (footballer, born 1986), Dutch footballer
 Carlos Ramos (footballer, born 1999), Venezuelan footballer